Aechmea eurycorymbus is a plant species in the genus Aechmea. This species is endemic to eastern Brazil.

Cultivars
The species is widely cultivated as an ornamental. Cultivars include:

 Aechmea 'Big Harv'
 Aechmea 'Carioca'
 Aechmea 'Forest Fire'
 × Portemea 'Hilda Ariza'

References

eurycorymbus
Flora of Brazil
Plants described in 1935